Opeolu Makanju Adeoye is an American physician who is the BJC HealthCare Distinguished Professor of Emergency Medicine and Department Chair at the Washington University School of Medicine. He was elected Fellow of the National Academy of Medicine in 2022.

Early life and education 
Adeoye was an undergraduate student at the University of Maryland, Baltimore County (UMBC), where he majored in biochemistry. He father died from a stroke at the age of 45 and his mother from colorectal cancer at 40, so he became interested in medicine at a young age. He moved to the University of Pittsburgh School of Medicine for medical studies, and collaborated with Westinghouse High School to deliver a mentoring program for African-American teenagers. He also launched an educational initiative at the University of Pittsburgh School of Medicine, where he studied medical education and healthcare. He was awarded the Herbert W. Nickens scholarship. He moved to the University of Cincinnati College of Medicine for residency, where he specialized in emergency medicine.

Research and career 
Adeoye specialized in neurosurgery and emergency medicine. He directed the Greater Cincinnati stroke centre and led the Strategies to Innovate Emergency Care Clinical Trials (SIREN) network. He studied how acute-care interventions impact the outcomes of traumatic brain injuries and strokes. He has sought to understand how bodily proteins impact the outcomes of stroke, and how the circulation of immune cells (leukocytes) is affected by the inflammatory response. In 2018, he was awarded a $30 million grant from the National Institutes of Health to study the effectiveness of combination therapies in implementing tissue plasminogen activators. Adeoye was made chief medical officer of Sense Neuro Diagnostics, a technology that can provide information on brain function in real-time.

In 2020, Adeoye was appointed the BJC HealthCare Distinguished Professor of Emergency Medicine and elected chair of the department at Washington University in St. Louis. He was elected fellow of both the National Academy of Medicine and the American Society for Clinical Investigation in 2022.

Selected publications

References 

University of Maryland, Baltimore County alumni
University of Cincinnati College of Medicine alumni
University of Pittsburgh School of Medicine alumni
Washington University School of Medicine faculty
Living people
21st-century American physicians
American neurosurgeons
Year of birth missing (living people)